Finsterwalder Glacier is a glacier on the northwest side of Hemimont Plateau,  wide and  long, flowing southwest from the central plateau of Graham Land, Antarctica, toward the head of Lallemand Fjord. Its mouth lies between the mouths of Haefeli Glacier and Klebelsberg Glacier, the three glaciers merging with Sharp Glacier where the latter enters the fjord. It was first surveyed from the plateau in 1946–47 by the Falkland Islands Dependencies Survey, and named by them for Sebastian Finsterwalder and his son, Richard Finsterwalder, German glaciologists.

See also
 List of glaciers in the Antarctic
 Glaciology

References 

Glaciers of Loubet Coast